David Starr Newbury (born 1942) is the Gwendolen Carter professor of African studies at Smith College, Massachusetts.  He received his PhD from the University of Wisconsin–Madison in 1979 for thesis titled Kings and clans on Ijwi Island (Zaire), c. 1780-1840 under the supervision of Jan Vansina. His academic work has three major foci within East and Central Africa.  The first was pre-colonial societal transformation in the Kivu Rift Valley.  The second was how a Rwandan famine in the late 1920s reinforced colonial rule.  The final major focus was the transformation of a hunter-gatherer society in the eastern Democratic Republic of the Congo into an agricultural economy.  His recent work has included studies of the historical roots of Central African violence in the late 1990s to present. René Lemarchand states, "No attempt to grasp the historical context of genocide [in Rwanda] can ignore Catherine  and David Newbury’s seminal contributions."

Newbury is the chair of the Five College African Studies Council, is a member of the Program Committee of the 2009 Annual Meeting of the American Historical Association (AHA) and is member of the AHA Nominating Committee.  The chair of the Graduate Student Award Committee of the African Studies Association (ASA), he also co-edits, with Catharine Newbury, the Book Review of the African Studies Review, the ASA academic journal.

Publications

External links 

 Faculty biography

References 

1942 births
University of Wisconsin–Madison alumni
Smith College faculty
21st-century American historians
21st-century American male writers
Historians of Africa
Living people
American male non-fiction writers